Central Calcutta Polytechnic is a government polytechnic college in the city of Kolkata, West Bengal in India. It is affiliated with the West Bengal State Council of Technical Education, approved by All India Council for Technical Education and provides diploma level technical education to its students.

References

External links 

 

Educational institutions established in 1963
Engineering colleges in Kolkata
1963 establishments in West Bengal